A tagboard is a small message board on a website also called a shoutbox.

Tagboard may also refer to:

 Tagboard.com, a social media site that aggregates hashtagged posts
 D-21 Tagboard, a reconnaissance drone aircraft
 A form of paperboard
 Terminal strips, used in early electronics
 T.A.G., a DOS-based bulletin board system (BBS) software program, released from 1986 to 2000